No Shoes, No Shirt, No Problems is the sixth studio album by American country music singer Kenny Chesney. It was released in April 2002 via BNA Records. It became Chesney's first album to reach number one on the U.S. Billboard 200 and produced five singles on the Billboard Hot Country Songs chart between 2001 and 2003 with "Young" (number 2), "The Good Stuff" (number one), "A Lot of Things Different" (number 6), "Big Star" (number 2), and the title track (number 2). A live performance music video was made for "Live Those Songs", which charted at number 60 without being released as a single; the song also became a concert tour opener for Chesney for several years. "On the Coast of Somewhere Beautiful" was also made into a music video, without being released as a single. "The Good Stuff" was the biggest hit of Chesney's career at the time, not only spending seven weeks at the top of the country charts, but also becoming Billboard's Number One country single of 2002 according to Billboard Year-End. In 2004, the album was certified quadruple platinum by the Recording Industry Association of America (RIAA) for sales of over four million copies in the United States.

"A Lot of Things Different" was previously recorded by Bill Anderson on his 2001 album of the same name.

Track listing

Personnel 
As listed in liner notes.

 Wyatt Beard – piano, background vocals (all tracks except 10 and 12)
 David Briggs – synthesizer
 Pat Buchanan – electric guitar
 Larry Byrom – acoustic guitar
 Melonie Cannon – vocals
 Mark Casstevens – electric guitar, ukulele
 Kenny Chesney – lead vocals 
 Dan Dugmore – steel guitar
 Glen Duncan – fiddle
 Sonny Garrish – steel guitar
 Larry Franklin – fiddle
 Rob Hajacos – fiddle
 Tim Hensley – acoustic guitar, banjo, background vocals (tracks 1,4,5,6,7,11)
 Wes Hightower – background vocals (tracks 8,10)
 John Hobbs – piano, Hammond B-3 organ, synthesizer
 Nicholas Hoffman – fiddle
 John Jorgenson – electric guitar
 Paul Leim – drums, percussion, tambourine
 B. James Lowry – acoustic guitar, electric guitar, gut string guitar
 Randy McCormick – piano, Hammond B-3 organ, synthesizer
 Tim McGraw – vocals on track 12 (uncredited)
 Liana Manis – background vocals (tracks 2,7,8)
 Steve Marshall – bass guitar
 Brent Mason – acoustic guitar, electric guitar
 Clayton Mitchell – electric guitar
 Steve Nathan – piano, Hammond B-3 organ, synthesizer
 Dale Oliver – electric guitar
 Sean Paddock – drums
 Larry Paxton – bass guitar
 Gary Prim – piano, synthesizer
 Michael Rhodes – bass guitar
 Sunny Russ – background vocals (track 11)
 John Willis – electric guitar

Charts

Weekly charts

Year-end charts

Singles

Certifications

References 

2002 albums
Kenny Chesney albums
BNA Records albums
Albums produced by Buddy Cannon
Albums produced by Norro Wilson